The Centre for Energy, Petroleum and Mineral Law and Policy (CEPMLP) is a graduate school at the University of Dundee, Scotland, United Kingdom, focused on the fields of international business transactions, energy law and policy, mining and the use of natural resources.

It is affiliated with, but not part of, the University of Dundee School of Law.

The CEPMLP is part of the University of Dundee's School of Social Sciences and is based in the Carnegie Building on the Geddes Quadrangle of the University's main campus.

The CEPMLP adopts an interdisciplinary approach to teaching, research and consultancy providing perspective on how governments, business and communities operate.

Master's degrees 

The CEPMLP offers a wide range of degrees from full-time taught master's degrees both full-time on site and by distance learning, as well as research degrees and executive leadership programmes.

Academic credentials 

 Current RAE (UK Research Assessment Exercise) rating of 5.
 Awarded the highest rank available by the UK Quality Assurance Agency for Higher Education (2002)for the taught postgraduate programme.
 Queen's Award for Enterprise in International Trade, 2004
 Doctoral programme with more than 40 PhD students, and a faculty of renowned international experts.

Strategic alliances with partner institutions 

 Washington College of Law at the American University, Washington, DC, USA.
 Institut français du pétrole, Paris, France.

References 
 The Quality Assurance Agency for Higher Education, (2002), "Academic review: Subject Review; Law, University of Dundee", https://web.archive.org/web/20071008134635/http://www.qaa.ac.uk/reviews/reports/subjectlevel/sr060_02.pdf, accessed 02-10-2007
 LLM Guide Master's of Law Programmes World Wide, http://www.llm-guide.com/board/6332, accessed 28-09-2007
 Oil Voice Forum, https://web.archive.org/web/20071018042804/http://forum.oilvoice.com/topic.asp?TOPIC_ID=764, accessed 28-09-2007
 Cresswell, J., (2006), "Scots energy and mineral law centre a hidden jewel", Press & Journal, Aberdeen.
 Department of Trade and Industry (Scotland), (2006), "Dundee University receives Royal Award Visit", http://www.gnn.gov.uk/content/detail.asp?NewsAreaID=2&ReleaseID=229917, accessed 02-10-2007.
 The Queen's Awards for Enterprise, 2004 Winners, https://web.archive.org/web/20070927064335/http://www.queensawards.org.uk/business/Winners/2004.html, accessed 09-10-2007.

External links 
 The Centre for Energy, Petroleum and Mineral Law and Policy

University of Dundee
Energy in Scotland
Petroleum engineering schools